Ryan Jeffrey Brown Kenny (born September 11, 1987) is an American former professional soccer player.

Early life and education 
Kenny was born September 11, 1987, in Livermore, California.  He played high school soccer at Buchanan High School in Clovis, California.

Kenny attended the University of California, Santa Barbara and was a student-athlete on the UC Santa Barbara Gauchos men's soccer team.  He battled to serve as backup to incumbent UCSB starter Kyle Reynish, but ultimately redshirted and made no appearances.

Kenny transferred to California State University, Sacramento after his first season and it was announced that Kenny would join the Sacramento State Hornets men's soccer team in March 2006.  He played for the Hornets for four seasons and on his departure ranked third all-time in career saves (160) and goals against average (1.49).

Playing career 
During his college years, Kenny also played several seasons for Fresno Fuego of the USL Premier Development League, leading them to a league title and a National Semi-Final appearance to be named Co-Defensive player of the year.

After graduating from Sacramento State, Kenny spent 2010 training with Major League Soccer side Real Salt Lake.

In February 2011, Kenny signed his first professional contract with the Rochester Rhinos in the USL Pro.  Former UCSB teammates Tyler Rosenlund and Alfonso Motagalvan were teammates.  He made his professional debut on May 10, 2011, in a game against the Harrisburg City Islanders, which was his only USL Pro appearance for the club.  He made one further appearance for the Rhinos, a 2011 Lamar Hunt U.S. Open Cup game on June 14, 2011, against Phoenix SC, which was his last professional appearance.

In the offseason, Kenny suffered injuries to both shoulders and was not able to compete again.

Career statistics

References

External links 
 Fresno FC Technical Staff
 Rochester Rhinos profile
 Sacramento State player profile
 UC Santa Barbara player profile

1987 births
Living people
American soccer players
UC Santa Barbara Gauchos men's soccer players
Fresno Fuego players
Rochester New York FC players
Sacramento State Hornets men's soccer players
USL League Two players
USL Championship players
Association football goalkeepers
Fresno FC coaches